Waunarlwydd ( – arlwydd is a local variant of arglwydd) is a village and community in Swansea, Wales, within the newly formed Waunarlwydd ward in 2021. Waunarlwydd became a community in 2022.

Transport
Buses are provided by First Cymru: these are the 15 or 16 Swansea - Waunarlwydd and Swansea - Gorseinon.

The main road in and out of the village is the B4295. The nearest motorway junction is 47 Swansea West (Penllergaer) on the M4.

The original main road from Swansea was Waunarlwydd Road, which starts from Cockett Road (A4216) at the Cockett Inn pub and runs to the meeting point of Cwmbach Road and Swansea Road at the old Lamb & Flag pub.

Although the West Wales Line runs through the village, there is no actual railway station: the nearest is Gowerton.

Economy
Waunarlwydd was the home of an aluminium rolling operation owned by US company Alcoa. Alcoa announced in November 2006 that it would close the plant by the end of March 2007, with the loss of 298 jobs. Decommissioning works are now taking place, while a small workforce is still employed in homogenisation, where heat treatment takes place for the Kitts Green plant.

TIMET, the world's largest supplier of titanium metals, is now the major employer in the village, with the mill one of four European locations.

There are 3 nursing homes: Ashgrove House, Tŷ Waunarlwydd and Tŷ Victoria.

There are two pubs in the village, the Masons Arms and the newly re-opened Farmers Arms, both located on Swansea Road. The club house for the rugby club is on Roseland Road. The old Village Inn (previously called the Domino) pub closed but was converted into the Grill House restaurant.There was a pub called The Lamb and Flag which was converted into a B&B in 1983 and then converted into a care home 1987.

Schools
There are two primary schools in the village: one is English language medium known as Waunarlwydd Primary School, this is located on Brithwen Road and replaced the original Swansea Road school. The other, Ysgol Gynradd Gymraeg Y Login Fach, is a Welsh language school located on Roseland Road.

After primary school children go on to either Ysgol Gyfun Gŵyr or Gowerton Comprehensive School.

Religion
The Anglican church in the village is St Barnabas on Victoria Road. The church was built in 1888 for £1,200 in an Early English style and enlarged in 1903.

There are now only 2 chapels, Seion (Zion) (Welsh Baptist - Bedyddwyr) and Sardis (Welsh Congregational, built in 1860 to seat 500) are both on Swansea Road. Bethany (English Baptist, built in 1875 to seat 250) on Bryn Road was closed and the land has been sold.

Sport
 Rugby: Waunarlwydd RFC currently play in WRU League 1 West Central and have 3 pitches
 Football: Waunarlwydd Galaxy has senior and junior teams competing in the Swansea Senior League in the Welsh football league system and have 2 pitches
 Cricket: Waunarlwydd Cricket Club compete in Division 7 of the South Wales Cricket Association and play their home matches at the Elba in Gowerton 
 Darts: There are teams at the Farmers Arms and Masons Arms, there is also a woman's dart team that plays its trade in the Masons Arms  .
Pool: the village plays host to a largely unsuccessful pool team with just 2 cup runs worth mentioning (Ashley Jones 2014 Gower cup Semi finals) (Daniel Penhorwood Gower cup Semi finals 2015), both of which ended in semi-final disappointment.
 Motorcycling and Quad biking : the village is very friendly and encouraging to motorcycling and Quad bike riding with successful track day riders on and off road riders have success in their various sports. It has been a welcoming village to motorcycling for many decades
 Lawn Bowls is played down by the side of the factory situated at the bottom of the village
 Other: various indoor sports, classes and bingo are held in the Community Centre located on Victoria Road.

See also 
 Kynal, brand name for the range of aluminium alloys produced by ICI at Waunarlwydd.

References

Villages in Swansea
Communities in Swansea
Swansea Bay (region)
Swansea electoral wards